Boyd Rasmussen (April 19, 1913 – August 7, 1998) was an American administrator who served as the Director of the Bureau of Land Management from 1966 to 1971.

References

1913 births
1998 deaths
Bureau of Land Management personnel
People from Elmore County, Idaho